Shani David (born July 6, 1991) is an Israeli football defender, currently playing for Maccabi Kishronot Hadera. She is a member of the Israeli national team, having played her debut for the national team against Belarus.  David also coaches at women's youth levels.

At the 2017 Maccabiah Games, David scored a goal in the final for Israel as it beat Team USA 2-1 to win a gold medal in women's soccer.

Honours
Cup (1):
 2014–15

References

External links

1991 births
Living people
Footballers from Hadera
Israeli women's footballers
Women's association football midfielders
Maccabi Kishronot Hadera F.C. players
Ligat Nashim players
Israel women's international footballers
Competitors at the 2017 Maccabiah Games
Maccabiah Games gold medalists for Israel
Maccabiah Games medalists in football
Jewish footballers
Jewish Israeli sportspeople
Jewish sportswomen